Wąż (Polish for "Snake") is a Polish coat of arms. It was used by several szlachta (noble) families under the Polish–Lithuanian Commonwealth.

Blazon
Gules, a snake vert, crowned or, holding an apple of the same, with two leaves vert.

Notable bearers
Notable bearers of this coat of arms have included:
 Guillaume Apollinaire (Wilhelm Albert Włodzimierz Apolinary Kostrowicki)

See also
 Polish heraldry
 Heraldry
 Coat of arms

External links
 www.herby.com.pl

Polish coats of arms